Korosten railway station is a railway station in the Ukrainen city of Korosten. An important junction station of the South-Western railway on the Kovel-Kyiv and Kelmenzi-Kalinkawitschy railway lines. The city is served by rail links to the national and regional capitals, as well as cross-border connections to neighboring Belarus. Currently (as of July 2020), the station is served by a single service to/from Kyiv, (one in each direction) on the electrified section of the mainline, with no through services to Zhytomyr.

History
In 1902, through the town of Iskorosten of the Ovruch district of the Volyn province of the Russian Empire, the Kiev - Kovel railway was laid and a railway station was built, in 1905 the first railway station was built at the station (architect A. Kobelev). After the outbreak of the First World War, the importance of the station increased, in 1915–1916. the lines Korosten - Zhitomir and Korosten - Ovruch were built, after which the station turned into a junction station.

On 15 July 1918, the railroad workers of the Korosten railway junction were among the first to start the All-Ukrainian strike of railroad workers. During the civil war, on 26 April 1920 the station was damaged, during the Soviet-Polish war, it was captured by Polish troops but was later rebuilt. During the Great Patriotic War and the German occupation, the station was damaged but was later restored. In 1983, a new station for 700 passengers was built at the Korosten station (architects V. Shvets and V. Grishchenko, engineer L. Mishchenko). Between 1983 and 1985 the station was electrified. In 1986, the locomotive driver of the locomotive depot station Korosten BA Zinchuk (among the first drivers of South-Western Railway has mastered driving heavy and dlinnosostavnyh trains and only during the period 1981–1985. Save 62 tons of diesel fuel, which were held 52 trains) became a laureate of the USSR state prize. In March 1995, the Verkhovna Rada of Ukraine added the Korosten station, as well as the locomotive depot and the carriage depot located at the station, to the list of objects, the privatization of which is prohibited due to their national significance.

On 6 March 2022, in the early hours of the morning, the Russian occupiers shelled the area around the railway station. The shelling resulted in the fast night train No. 95 (between Kyiv and Rakhiv) being delayed for almost 3 hours. The train was kept at a safe distance from the shelling, there were no casualties, and the rolling stock was not damaged. On 25 April 2022, the Russian occupiers launched another attack on the Korosten railway station.

Infrastructure 
The station is home to a checkpoint on the state border of Ukraine with Belarus, as well as a locomotive and wagon depot, railway engine station No. 122.

On 9 April 2018, a team of electromechanics for the repair of the railway catenary, working in the Korosten power supply distance (a separate unit of the regional branch "South-Western Railway") at the Korosten station during the given window, installed a sectional insulator (ISM-1M) for electrical separation of sections contact network. This device replaced the physically obsolete isolator of the previous generation.

Insulators of the ISM-1M series are used to divide the electrical contact network into separate operating sections with reliable isolation between them. They also provide a smooth transition of the slides of the current receivers of the electric rolling stock moving under the contact wire at a speed of up to 120 km/h.

Trains and destinations

International Routes

Gallery

See also
Ukrzaliznytsia - the national railway company of Ukraine

Citations

Bibliography

External links
South-Western railway of Ukraine - Official website 
  Ukraine Train Tickets - Online Sales

Southwestern Railways stations
Buildings and structures in Zhytomyr Oblast
Railway stations opened in 1902
Korosten